Venango is an unincorporated community in Ellsworth County, Kansas, United States.  It is located on the east bank of the Kanopolis Lake.

History
A post office was opened in Venango in 1875, and remained in operation until it was discontinued in 1902.

Education
The community is served by Smoky Valley USD 400 public school district.

See also
 Kanopolis Lake
 Kanopolis State Park
 Mushroom Rock State Park
 Yankee Run, Kansas, located on west bank of Kanopolis Lake

References

Further reading

External links
 Ellsworth County maps: Current, Historic, KDOT

Unincorporated communities in Ellsworth County, Kansas
Unincorporated communities in Kansas